Roy Francois Pienaar (born 17 July 1961) is a South African former first-class cricketer. He played for Transvaal, Western Province and Northern Transvaal/Northerns in domestic cricket and spent the period between 1987 and 1989 in England playing for Kent County Cricket Club. In both 1983 and 1990 he won the South African Cricket Annual Cricketer of the Year award.

Early life and career
Pienaar was born at Johannesburg in 1961 and educated at St Stithians College. He was a promising youth cricketer and by the age of 14 was playing club cricket in the Transvaal Premier League. By 16 he had broken in to the Transvaal B team and in late 1979, at age 18, was playing for the Transvaal A team which dominated the Currie Cup during the late 1970s and early 1980s.

After moving to play for Western Province in 1981–82, Pienaar captained the South African Universities side for a number of seasons, including against the rebel Australian XI which toured South Africa in 1985–86. He moved to play for Northern Transvaal ahead of the 1985–86 season and also captained the South African Defence Force cricket team and South African Cricket Board's Presidents XI during this period, the later team against another rebel Australian touring side in 1986–87. He played in four unofficial One Day International matches for the South Africa representative XI against the Australian XI in February 1987. He was the South African Cricket Annual Cricketer of the Year in 1983.

Playing in England
Later in 1987 Pienaar first played in England for Kent County Cricket Club. He was drafted in as a replacement for injured overseas player Eldine Baptiste, initially as a temporary replacement. Pienaar eventually played three summers at Kent, making a favourable impression, both scoring runs and taking "important wickets" during the sides second-placed 1988 County Championship campaign. Knee injuries, however, limited his bowling in 1989, and Pienaar was forced to cancel his Kent contract. He had previously played league cricket for Bradford St Lawrence in 1980.

Following knee surgery, Pienaar bowled very infrequently for the rest of his career. He had first suffered from issues with his knees at the age of 10 and these were exacerbated by the bowling workload he took on at Kent. He played in the only unofficial Test match played against the rebel England side which toured South Africa in 1989–90

Later career
Pienaar had moved back to Transvaal in 1988–89 and later moved again to play for Northern Transvaal from 1993–94 until his retirement. He played his last senior cricket in December 1999. He captained both sides on occasion and was again the South African Cricket Annual Cricketer of the Year in 1990. As a batsman Pienaar was considered "gifted" and used the square cut effectively.

During the early-1990s, Pienaar established a business making biltong. The company was sold during the 2000s, allowing Pienaar to retire in his 40s and focus on his family.

Notes

References

External links

1961 births
Living people
South African cricketers
Western Province cricketers
Gauteng cricketers
Kent cricketers
Alumni of St Stithians College